Borneo  is a small community in the Canadian province of Nova Scotia, located in  The Municipality of the District of Guysborough in Guysborough County.

References
Borneo on Destination Nova Scotia

Communities in Guysborough County, Nova Scotia
General Service Areas in Nova Scotia